Soulacoaster: The Diary of Me is an autobiography by American R&B artist R. Kelly, co-written with David Ritz. The book was released June 28, 2012. R. Kelly dedicated this book to his mother, who died in the early 1990s, and his high school music teacher, Lena McLin. Kelly shares his life story through episodic tales and exclusive colour photographs. The book is divided in three segments (Act 1 to Act 3).

Plot
The book chronicles the journey of the singer R. Kelly from poverty to fame: his life begins in a rough neighborhood, being molested as a little kid by a woman and street performing by the Chicago 'L' tracks and struggling to make it and provide money to his single mother for rent and comfort. Ultimately, however, he becomes a rich and successful musician.

See also
I Admit (R. Kelly song)
Trapped in the Closet: The Book

References

Music autobiographies
American autobiographies
R. Kelly
2012 non-fiction books